Maximillion Drake Thieriot (born October 14, 1988) is an American actor and director. He made his acting debut in the 2004 adventure comedy film Catch That Kid. Thieriot has since appeared in the action comedy The Pacifier (2005), the mystery comedy Nancy Drew (2007), the sci-fi Jumper (2008), the erotic thriller Chloe (2009), the supernatural horror My Soul to Take (2010), the drama Disconnect (2012), the psychological horror-thriller House at the End of the Street (2012), and the action-thriller Point Break (2015).

From 2013 to 2017, Thieriot starred as Dylan Massett in A&E's drama-thriller series Bates Motel. He appeared as John Coffee "Jack" Hays in History Channel's miniseries Texas Rising (2015). From 2017 to 2022, he played Navy SEAL Clay Spenser in the CBS drama series SEAL Team. Starting in 2022, Thieriot has a starring role as Bode Donovan (aka Bode Leone) in the CBS drama series Fire Country, which he also co-created, and sometimes writes and executive produces.

Early life
Thieriot was born in Los Altos Hills, California, the son of Bridgit Ann (née Snyder) and George Cameron Thieriot. He has one older sister and one younger brother. He was raised in the small town of Occidental in Sonoma County, California. Thieriot was educated at the Sonoma Country Day School in Santa Rosa, California for middle school, and went on to attend El Molino High School in Forestville, California, from which he graduated in 2006. Thieriot's ancestors once owned the San Francisco Chronicle. His great-great-grandfather, M. H. de Young, who was of Dutch Jewish descent and later converted to Catholicism, co-founded the paper with his brother Charles de Young, and his relatives, Charles and Richard Thieriot, were the editors and publishers of the paper. Thieriot's paternal grandparents, Frances Harrison (née Dade) and Ferdinand Melly Thieriot, died in the sinking of the SS Andrea Doria in 1956.

Career
Thieriot was signed to talent manager Don Gibble after taking his improvisation class. He modeled for Gap and appeared in two short films, before being cast in his first feature film role, 2004's adventure film Catch That Kid. He was subsequently cast in 2005's action comedy film The Pacifier, portraying one of the family members protected by a Navy SEAL (Vin Diesel). He was nominated for the Young Artist Award for Best Performance in a Feature Film – Supporting Young Actor for his role. Thieriot then appeared in the drama The Astronaut Farmer (2007) and the film adaptation of Nancy Drew (2007).

In 2008, he played a younger version of Hayden Christensen's character in Jumper. That same year, he appeared in Kit Kittredge: An American Girl, for which he won the Young Artist Award Best Performance in a Feature Film – Young Ensemble Cast with his co-stars. In 2009, Thieriot co-starred in the erotic thriller Chloe. Chloe enjoyed commercial success and became director Atom Egoyan's biggest ever box office earner. The following year, he played the lead role in Wes Craven's horror film My Soul to Take.

In 2011, he starred in the independent comedy The Family Tree and played the lead role in the drama film Foreverland. Thieriot then co-starred in the Mark Tonderai–directed psychological horror-thriller House at the End of the Street (2012). That same year, he starred in the drama film Disconnect. Also in 2012, Thieriot was cast in a leading role in Roland Emmerich's drama pilot for ABC, Dark Horse, but the project was not picked up to series. From 2013 until its ending in 2017, he portrayed Dylan Massett, the half-brother of Norman Bates, in the critically acclaimed drama series Bates Motel. He made his directorial debut on the series with the fifth season episode "Hidden".

In 2015, he starred in the History Channel event miniseries Texas Rising as Jack Hays, a captain of the Texas Rangers, and appeared in the remake of the action-thriller film Point Break. In 2017, Thieriot began starring as Navy SEAL Clay Spenser in the CBS drama series SEAL Team until 2022.  In 2022, Thieriot began portraying Bode Donovan in the CBS drama series Fire Country, for which he also serves as a producer.

Personal life
In 2012, Thieriot became engaged to Alexis Murphy, his girlfriend of seven years. He proposed during a trip to the Caribbean, where the pair met as teenagers. On June 1, 2013, they were married in Lake Tahoe, California. The couple announced the birth of their first child, a boy, in 2015. They had a second son in 2018. Through his sister's marriage, Thieriot is the brother-in-law of former Philadelphia Phillies baseball pitcher Michael Stutes.

As well as being an actor, Thieriot is also a vintner. He, along with childhood friends Christopher Strieter and Myles Lawrence-Briggs, owns vineyards in his hometown of Occidental and distributes wine through their label Senses. In the third season of Bates Motel, the main characters can be seen drinking Senses during a family-dinner scene.

Filmography

Film

Television series

Director

Awards and nominations

References

External links

 
 

1988 births
21st-century American male actors
American male child actors
American male film actors
American male television actors
American television directors
American winemakers
Living people
Male actors from California
People from Los Altos Hills, California
People from Occidental, California